Semerak may refer to:

Ostap Semerak (born 1972), Ukrainian politician 
Semerak (state constituency), state constituency in Kelantan, Malaysia